Birria is a Mexican dish from the state of Jalisco. The dish is a meat stew or soup traditionally made from goat meat, but occasionally made from beef, lamb, mutton or chicken. The meat is marinated in an adobo made of vinegar, dried chiles, garlic, and herbs and spices (including cumin, bay leaves, and thyme) before being cooked in a broth. The dish is often served at celebratory occasions such as weddings and baptisms and during holidays such as Christmas and Easter. Preparation techniques vary, but the dish is often served with corn tortillas, onion, cilantro and lime.

Restaurants or street carts that serve birria are known as birrierias and exist throughout Mexico, especially in Michoacán and Jalisco. However, neighboring Mexican states have their own variations of the dish, including Aguascalientes, Zacatecas, and Colima.

History
In 1519, Hernán Cortés and the Conquistadors first landed in Mexico, bringing various old-world domestic animals, including goats. During the Conquest of the Aztec Empire, the Conquistadors were faced with an overpopulation of goats, so they decided to give the animals to the natives.

While goat meat was looked down upon by the Conquistadors, as it was tough, had a strong smell, and was hard to digest, the natives accepted the animals, marinating the meat in indigenous styles making it palatable and appetizing.

The dishes they produced were called "birria", a derogatory term meaning "worthless", by the Spanish, in reference to their having given the natives meat with apparently noxious characteristics. According to legend, the dish was invented accidentally during the eruption of a volcano, when a shepherd was forced to abandon his goats in a cave where they were cooked perfectly by the steam.

Variations

Traditionally birria was served on bread, tortillas or even directly in hand. Many variations of the dish have derived since, causing arguments amongst birria enthusiasts on what is authentic and or the original way. In the early days birria was not served in a broth. The meat was dry seasoned and placed inside a makeshift oven built from rock and mud preheated with firewood. The embers were spread and maguey leaves were laid down to protect the meat from scorching. Meat was then placed directly on top of the maguey leaves and the opening was closed with more rock and mud. This technique ensured the heat would not escape creating a pressurized oven. The meat juices and maguey leaves created moisture and steam causing the meat to be juicy and tender.

In 1950, a taquero named Guadalupe Zarata set up a taco stand in Tijuana, after moving there from Coatzingo, Puebla. Zarata's stand initially sold asado and pastor tacos. Zárate soon decided to make beef birria because goat meat was more expensive and less fatty. One day, someone told Zárate to add more liquid to the meat.

Other versions of the dish include birria tatemada (charred birria). After marinating and simmering the meat, it is placed in a hot oven until crispy.

Gallery

See also 

 List of goat dishes
 List of Mexican dishes
 Menudo
 Mexican cuisine
 Pozole
 Quesabirria

References

Goat dishes
Jalisco culture
Mexican cuisine
Mexican stews
Street food in Mexico
Wedding food